Jeffrey Thomas Fischer (born August 17, 1963) is a former pitcher in Major League Baseball. He pitched in 6 games for the Montreal Expos and Los Angeles Dodgers in the 1987 and 1989 seasons.

Fischer was born in West Palm Beach, Florida.

Fischer graduated from the University of Florida with a bachelor's degree in telecommunications in 1986. In 1984, he played collegiate summer baseball with the Falmouth Commodores of the Cape Cod Baseball League.

See also 

 Florida Gators
 List of Florida Gators baseball players

References

External links 

1963 births
Living people
Albuquerque Dukes players
American expatriate baseball players in Canada
Baseball players from Florida
Florida Gators baseball players
Falmouth Commodores players
Indianapolis Indians players
Jacksonville Expos players
Los Angeles Dodgers players
Major League Baseball pitchers
Montreal Expos players
Vero Beach Dodgers players
West Palm Beach Expos players